The 2000 NRL Grand Final was the conclusive and premiership-deciding game of the 2000 NRL season. It was contested by the Brisbane Broncos, who had finished the season in 1st place, and the Sydney Roosters, who had finished the season in 2nd place. The Brisbane Broncos were favourites heading into the grand final with the Sydney Roosters as underdogs. Brisbane were premiership favourites for most of the season after leading the competition every round since round 4. It was their fifth grand final appearance in nine years, while it was the first for the Roosters in twenty years. The attendance of 94,277 was the third highest ever seen at a rugby league match in Australia. It was the first time that the Clive Churchill Medal was presented separately with a ribbon being worn around the neck, as previously it was presented in a case.

Background

The 2000 NRL season was the 93rd season of professional rugby league football in Australia and the third to be run by the National Rugby League. Fourteen teams competed from February until August for the minor premiership before the top eight teams played in the finals series, which culminated in the grand final. The season and grand final were played a month earlier than usual due to the 2000 Summer Olympics held in Sydney during September.

Brisbane Broncos

The 2000 Brisbane Broncos season was the thirteenth in the club's history. Coached by Wayne Bennett and captained by Kevin Walters, they finished the regular season 1st (out of 14 teams) to claim their 4th minor premiership. The Broncos played two finals matches (against the 8th-placed Cronulla-Sutherland Sharks then the 7th-placed Parramatta Eels), winning both to qualify for their 5th grand final.

Sydney Roosters

The 2000 Sydney Roosters season was the 93rd in the club's history. Coached by Graham Murray and captained by Brad Fittler, they finished the regular season 2nd (out of 14 teams). After losing their first finals match, the Roosters won their next two to reach their 18th grand final.

Teams
For Brisbane, Shane Webcke went into the match with a broken arm, with Tonie Carroll also under an injury cloud. It was revealed after the match that Darren Lockyer was also in doubt due to illness.

Sydney Roosters forward Luke Ricketson was in doubt up until the day of the match due to a hamstring injury.

Match details

First half
Sydney were unlucky not to have an early lead only three minutes in when Shannon Hegarty got over the line, but good cover defence by Brisbane fullback Darren Lockyer stopped the Roosters from scoring. The Broncos opened the scoring with a penalty goal to Michael De Vere to make it 2–0 at the 12th minute. Four minutes later, Lote Tuqiri scored the first try of the grand final which was converted by De Vere to make it 8–0 in Brisbane's favour. Michael De Vere extended his side's lead out to 10–0 with another penalty goal in the 27th minute. The Roosters opened their scoring in the 35th minute with a penalty goal to Luke Phillips to make it 10–2 and it remained that scoreline until halftime.

Second half
In the first minute of play after the break, Broncos five-eighth Ben Ikin got hit late with a high shot and went to the bench, missing twenty minutes of the second half. Brisbane had a chance to go ten in front with a penalty goal but missed marginally. However the Broncos extended their lead to 14–2 when Wendell Sailor scored in the 56th minute, but the conversion was unsuccessful by De Vere. Craig Fitzgibbon got Sydney's first try of the match in the 71st minute to give the Roosters a glimmer of hope, but his conversion was unsuccessful as it dropped onto the cross bar and bounced out, leaving the score 14–6.

Scoreboard

See also
2000 Brisbane Broncos season
2001 World Club Challenge

References

External links
2000 NRL Grand Final at NRL.com
Match replay at NRL.com

NRL Grand Finals
Grand final
Brisbane Broncos matches
Sydney Roosters matches